Nasim Khan may refer to:
 Nasim Khan (cricketer), Pakistani cricketer
 Nasim Khan, an alternative name for Nasim Baras (born 1993), Afghan cricketer
 Nasim Wali Khan, politician in Pakistan